László Szőke (born 21 August 1966) is a Hungarian boxer. He competed in the men's featherweight event at the 1988 Summer Olympics. At the 1988 Summer Olympics, he lost to John Wanjau of Kenya.

References

1966 births
Living people
Hungarian male boxers
Olympic boxers of Hungary
Boxers at the 1988 Summer Olympics
Boxers from Budapest
Featherweight boxers